The 13th Satellite Awards, honoring the best in film and television of 2008, were given on December 14, 2008.

Special achievement awards
Auteur Award (for his signature scope and style of filmmaking) – Baz Luhrmann

Mary Pickford Award (for outstanding contribution to the entertainment industry) – Louis Gossett Jr.

Nikola Tesla Award (for his innovative make-up, prosthetics, and creature effects in films) – Rick Baker

Outstanding New Talent – Brandon Walters

Motion picture winners and nominees

Best Actor – Drama
Richard Jenkins – The Visitor
 Leonardo DiCaprio – Revolutionary Road
 Frank Langella – Frost/Nixon
 Sean Penn – Milk
 Mickey Rourke – The Wrestler
 Mark Ruffalo – What Doesn't Kill You

Best Actor – Musical or Comedy
Ricky Gervais – Ghost Town
 Josh Brolin – W.
 Michael Cera – Nick & Norah's Infinite Playlist
 Brendan Gleeson – In Bruges
 Sam Rockwell – Choke
 Mark Ruffalo – The Brothers Bloom

Best Actress – Drama
Angelina Jolie – Changeling
 Anne Hathaway – Rachel Getting Married
 Melissa Leo – Frozen River
 Meryl Streep – Doubt
 Kristin Scott Thomas – I've Loved You So Long (Il y a longtemps que je t'aime)
 Kate Winslet – The Reader

Best Actress – Musical or Comedy
Sally Hawkins – Happy-Go-Lucky
 Catherine Deneuve – A Christmas Tale (Un conte de Noël)
 Kat Dennings – Nick & Norah's Infinite Playlist
 Lisa Kudrow – Kabluey
 Debra Messing – Nothing like the Holidays
 Meryl Streep – Mamma Mia!

Best Animated or Mixed Media Film
WALL-E
 Bolt
 Horton Hears a Who!
 The Sky Crawlers
 The Tale of Despereaux
 Waltz with Bashir (Vals im Bashir)

Best Art Direction and Production Design
Australia
 Brideshead Revisited
 City of Ember
 The Curious Case of Benjamin Button
 The Duchess
 Revolutionary Road

Best Cinematography
Australia
 Brideshead Revisited
 Changeling
 The Curious Case of Benjamin Button
 The Duchess
 Snow Angels

Best Costume Design
The Duchess
 Australia
 Brideshead Revisited
 City of Ember
 The Curious Case of Benjamin Button
 Sex and the City

Best Director
Danny Boyle – Slumdog Millionaire
 Stephen Daldry – The Reader
 Ron Howard – Frost/Nixon
 Tom McCarthy – The Visitor
 Christopher Nolan – The Dark Knight
 Gus Van Sant – Milk

Best Documentary Film
Anita O'Day: The Life of a Jazz Singer (TIE)  Man on Wire (TIE) Encounters at the End of the World
 Pray the Devil Back to Hell
 Religulous
 Waltz with Bashir (Vals im Bashir)

Best EditingIron Man
 Australia
 The Dark Knight
 Frost/Nixon
 Quantum of Solace
 Slumdog Millionaire

Best Film – Drama
Slumdog Millionaire
 Frost/Nixon
 Frozen River
 Milk
 The Reader
 Revolutionary Road

Best Film – Musical or Comedy
Happy-Go-Lucky
 Choke
 In Bruges
 Nick & Norah's Infinite Playlist
 Tropic Thunder
 Vicky Cristina Barcelona

Best Foreign Language Film
Gomorrah (Gomorra) • Italy Caramel (Sekkar banat) • France / Lebanon
 The Class (Entre les murs) • France
 Let the Right One In (Låt den rätte komma in) • Sweden
 Padre Nuestro (Sangre de Mi Sangre) • Argentina
 Reprise • Norway

Best Original ScoreSlumdog Millionaire – A. R. Rahman Australia – David Hirschfelder
 Horton Hears a Who! – John Powell
 Milk – Danny Elfman
 Quantum of Solace – David Arnold
 WALL-E – Thomas Newman

Best Original Song"Another Way to Die" – Quantum of Solace
 "By the Boab Tree" – Australia
 "Down to Earth" – WALL-E
 "If the World" – Body of Lies
 "Jai Ho" – Slumdog Millionaire
 "The Wrestler" – The Wrestler

Best Screenplay – Adapted
Frost/Nixon – Peter Morgan The Curious Case of Benjamin Button – Eric Roth and Robin Swicord
 Doubt – John Patrick Shanley
 Elegy – Philip Roth
 The Reader – David Hare
 Revolutionary Road – Justin Haythe
 Slumdog Millionaire – Simon Beaufoy

Best Screenplay – OriginalThe Visitor – Tom McCarthy Australia – Baz Luhrmann
 Frozen River – Courtney Hunt
 Milk – Dustin Lance Black
 Seven Pounds – Grant Nieporte

Best SoundThe Dark Knight
 Australia
 The Day the Earth Stood Still
 Iron Man
 Quantum of Solace
 WALL-E

Best Supporting Actor
Michael Shannon – Revolutionary Road
 Robert Downey Jr. – Tropic Thunder
 James Franco – Milk
 Philip Seymour Hoffman – Doubt
 Heath Ledger – The Dark Knight (posthumous)
 Rade Šerbedžija – Fugitive Pieces

Best Supporting Actress
Rosemarie DeWitt – Rachel Getting Married
 Beyoncé – Cadillac Records
 Penélope Cruz – Elegy
 Anjelica Huston – Choke
 Sophie Okonedo – The Secret Life of Bees
 Emma Thompson – Brideshead Revisited

Best Visual Effects
Australia
 The Dark Knight
 The Day the Earth Stood Still
 Iron Man
 Quantum of Solace

Television winners and nominees

Best Actor – Drama Series
Bryan Cranston – Breaking Bad
 Gabriel Byrne – In Treatment
 Michael C. Hall – Dexter
 Jon Hamm – Mad Men
 Jason Isaacs – Brotherhood
 David Tennant – Doctor Who

Best Actor – Musical or Comedy Series
Justin Kirk – Weeds
 Alec Baldwin – 30 Rock
 Danny DeVito – It's Always Sunny in Philadelphia
 David Duchovny – Californication
 Jonny Lee Miller – Eli Stone
 Lee Pace – Pushing Daisies

Best Actor – Miniseries or TV Film
Paul Giamatti – John Adams
 Benedict Cumberbatch – The Last Enemy
 Ralph Fiennes – Bernard and Doris
 Stellan Skarsgård – God on Trial
 Kevin Spacey – Recount
 Tom Wilkinson – Recount

Best Actress – Drama Series
Anna Paquin – True Blood
 Glenn Close – Damages
 Kathryn Erbe – Law & Order: Criminal Intent
 Sally Field – Brothers and Sisters
 Holly Hunter – Saving Grace
 Kyra Sedgwick – The Closer

Best Actress – Musical or Comedy Series
Tracey Ullman – Tracey Ullman's State of the Union
 Christina Applegate – Samantha Who?
 America Ferrera – Ugly Betty
 Tina Fey – 30 Rock
 Julia Louis-Dreyfus – The New Adventures of Old Christine
 Mary-Louise Parker – Weeds

Best Actress – Miniseries or TV Film
Judi Dench – Cranford
 Jacqueline Bisset – An Old Fashioned Thanksgiving
 Laura Linney – John Adams
 Phylicia Rashad – A Raisin in the Sun
 Susan Sarandon – Bernard and Doris
 Julie Walters – Filth: The Mary Whitehouse Story

Best Miniseries
Cranford
 John Adams
 The Last Enemy

Best Series – Drama
Dexter
 Brotherhood
 In Treatment
 Life on Mars
 Mad Men
 Primeval

Best Series – Musical or Comedy
Tracey Ullman's State of the Union
 30 Rock
 The Colbert Report
 It's Always Sunny in Philadelphia
 Pushing Daisies
 Skins

Best Supporting Actor – Miniseries or TV Film
Nelsan Ellis – True Blood
 Željko Ivanek – Damages
 Harvey Keitel – Life on Mars
 John Noble – Fringe
 John Slattery – Mad Men
 Jimmy Smits – Dexter

Best Supporting Actress – Miniseries or TV Film
Fionnula Flanagan – Brotherhood
 Kristin Chenoweth – Pushing Daisies
 Laura Dern – Recount
 Sarah Polley – John Adams
 Dianne Wiest – In Treatment
 Chandra Wilson – Grey's Anatomy

Best TV Film
Filth: The Mary Whitehouse Story
 24: Redemption
 Bernard and Doris
 God on Trial
 The Memory Keeper's Daughter
 Recount

New Media winners and nominees

Best Classic DVD
The Godfather, The Godfather Part II, and The Godfather Part III (The Godfather Collection – The Coppola Restoration) Beetlejuice (20th Anniversary Deluxe Edition)
 Diva
 Dracula (75th Anniversary Edition)
 High Noon (Two-Disc Ultimate Collector's Edition)
 The Mummy
 Psycho
 Road House
 Touch of Evil (50th Anniversary Edition)
 Young Frankenstein

Best DVD ExtrasIron Man (Two-Disc Collector's Edition) 4 Months, 3 Weeks and 2 Days
 Across the Universe
 The Assassination of Jesse James by the Coward Robert Ford
 The Bank Job
 Eight Men Out
 Gone Baby Gone
 High Noon (Two-Disc Ultimate Collector's Edition)
 Into the Wild
 WALL-E (Three-Disc Special Edition)

Best DVD Release of a TV Show
 30 Rock (Season 2)
 The Tudors (The Complete First Season)

Outstanding Action/Adventure GameMetal Gear Solid 4: Guns of the Patriots
 Dead Space
 LittleBigPlanet
 Super Mario Galaxy
 Super Smash Bros. Brawl

Outstanding Music/Rhythm Game
Rock Band 2
 Guitar Hero World Tour
 Patapon
 Rock Band
 SingStar

Outstanding Overall Blu-Ray
Sleeping Beauty (Two-Disc 50th Anniversary Platinum Edition Blu-Ray and DVD) The Dark Knight
 The Godfather, The Godfather Part II, and The Godfather Part III (The Godfather Collection – The Coppola Restoration)
 Iron Man
 WALL-E (Three-Disc Special Edition Blu-Ray and DVD)

Outstanding Overall DVDNo Country for Old Men
 3:10 to Yuma
 Atonement
 The Diving Bell and the Butterfly
 Juno
 Lars and the Real Girl
 Lust, Caution
 Michael Clayton
 Sweeney Todd: The Demon Barber of Fleet Street (Two-Disc Collection)
 The Visitor

Outstanding Puzzle/Strategy Game
World of Goo
 Advance Wars: Days of Ruin
 Professor Layton and the Curious Village
 Sid Meyer's Civilization Revolution
 Spore

Outstanding Sports/Racing Game
NHL 09
 Burnout Paradise
 FIFA 09
 Mario Kart Wii
 MLB 08: The Show
 Wii Fit

Outstanding Youth DVD
WarGames (25th Anniversary Edition) Avatar: The Last Airbender (Book 3 Fire, Vol. 4)
 Cars
 Enchanted
 Nim's Island
 One Hundred and One Dalmatians (Two-Disc Platinum Edition DVD)
 Sleeping Beauty (Two-Disc 50th Anniversary Platinum Edition Blu-Ray and DVD)
 The Spiderwick Chronicles
 WALL-E (Three-Disc Special Edition)
 The Water Horse (Two-Disc Edition)
 Watership Down (Deluxe Edition)

Awards breakdown

Film
Winners:
 3 / 6 Slumdog Millionaire: Best Director / Best Film – Drama / Best Original Score
 3 / 9 Australia: Best Art Direction and Production Design / Best Cinematography / Best Visual Effects
 2 / 2 Happy-Go-Lucky: Best Actress – Musical or Comedy / Best Film – Musical or Comedy
 2 / 3 The Visitor: Best Actor – Drama / Best Screenplay – Original
 1 / 1 Anita O'Day: The Life of a Jazz Singer: Best Documentary Film
 1 / 1 Ghost Town: Best Actor – Musical or Comedy
 1 / 1 Gomorrah (Gomorra): Best Foreign Language Film
 1 / 1 Man on Wire: Best Documentary Film
 1 / 2 Changeling: Best Actress – Drama
 1 / 2 Rachel Getting Married: Best Supporting Actress
 1 / 3 The Duchess: Best Costume Design
 1 / 3 Iron Man: Best Editing
 1 / 4 WALL-E: Best Animated or Mixed Media Film
 1 / 5 The Dark Knight: Best Sound
 1 / 5 Frost/Nixon: Best Screenplay – Adapted
 1 / 5 Quantum of Solace: Best Original Song
 1 / 5 Revolutionary Road: Best Supporting Actor

Losers:
 0 / 6 Milk
 0 / 4 Brideshead Revisited, The Curious Case of Benjamin Button, The Reader
 0 / 3 Choke, Nick & Norah's Infinite Playlist
 0 / 2 City of Ember, The Day the Earth Stood Still, Doubt, Elegy, Horton Hears a Who!, In Bruges, Frozen River, Waltz with Bashir (Vals im Bashir), The Wrestler

Television
Winners:
 2 / 2 Cranford: Best Actress – Miniseries or TV Film / Best Miniseries
 2 / 2 Tracey Ullman's State of the Union: Best Actress – Musical or Comedy Series / Best Series – Musical or Comedy
 2 / 2 True Blood: Best Actress – Drama Series / Best Supporting Actor – Miniseries or TV Film
 1 / 1 Breaking Bad: Best Actor – Drama Series
 1 / 2 Filth: The Mary Whitehouse Story: Best TV Film
 1 / 2 Weeds: Best Actor – Musical or Comedy Series
 1 / 3 Brotherhood: Best Supporting Actress – Miniseries or TV Film
 1 / 3 Dexter: Best Series – Drama
 1 / 4 John Adams: Best Actor – Miniseries or TV Film

Losers:
 0 / 4 Recount
 0 / 3 30 Rock, Bernard and Doris, In Treatment, Mad Men, Pushing Daisies
 0 / 2 Damages, God on Trial, It's Always Sunny in Philadelphia, The Last Enemy, Life on Mars

External links
 Official website of the International Press Academy

Satellite Awards ceremonies
2008 film awards
2008 television awards